This is a list of members of the Tasmanian House of Assembly between the 20 February 1937 election and the 13 December 1941 election. The term was elongated due to World War II.

Notes
  Labor MHA for Darwin, Joseph McGrath, died on 16 March 1937, just days after the election. A recount on 5 April 1937 resulted in Labor candidate Henry Lane being elected.
  Labor MHA for Franklin and Premier of Tasmania, Albert Ogilvie, died on 10 June 1939. A recount on 28 June 1939 resulted in Labor candidate Francis McDermott being elected.
  Labor MHA for Wilmot, Eric Ogilvie, resigned in August 1940. A recount on 28 August 1940 resulted in Labor candidate William Taylor being elected.
  Nationalist MHA for Darwin, Frank Edwards, resigned in August 1940. A recount on 31 August 1940 resulted in Nationalist candidate John Wright being elected.
  Nationalist MHA for Franklin, George Doyle, died on 26 October 1940. A recount on 8 November 1940 resulted in Nationalist candidate Vincent Shoobridge being elected.
  Labor (formerly Independent) MHA for Wilmot, George Becker, died on 23 April 1941. A recount on 8 May 1941 resulted in Labor candidate Lancelot Spurr being elected.
  Nationalist MHA for Denison, Arndell Lewis, resigned in May 1941. A recount on 2 June 1941 resulted in Nationalist candidate Ernest Turner being elected.

Sources
 
 Parliament of Tasmania (2006). The Parliament of Tasmania from 1856

Members of Tasmanian parliaments by term
20th-century Australian politicians